The 1985 NCAA Division II women's basketball tournament was the fourth annual tournament hosted by the NCAA to determine the national champion of Division II women's  collegiate basketball in the United States.

Cal Poly Pomona defeated defending champions Central Missouri State in the championship game, 80–69, the Broncos' second NCAA Division II national title. 

The championship rounds were contested at the Springfield Civic Center in Springfield, Massachusetts, hosted by Springfield College.

Regionals

East

Great Lakes

New England

North Central

South

South Atlantic

South Central

West

National Finals - Springfield, Massachusetts
Visiting team listed first and date March 17 in Elite Eight unless indicated

Final Four Location: Springfield Civic Center Host: Springfield College

All-tournament team
 Vickie Mitchell, Cal Poly Pomona
 Kelley Fraser, Cal Poly Pomona
 Sheri Jennum, Cal Poly Pomona
 Rosie Jones, Central Missouri State
 Anita Meadows, Mercer

See also
 1985 NCAA Division I women's basketball tournament
 1985 NCAA Division III women's basketball tournament
 1985 NCAA Division II men's basketball tournament
 1985 NAIA women's basketball tournament

References
 1985 NCAA Division II women's basketball tournament jonfmorse.com

 
NCAA Division II women's basketball tournament
1985 in sports in Massachusetts